Habib Umar bin Hafiz (born 27 May 1963) is a Yemeni Sunni and Sufi Islamic scholar, teacher, and founder and dean of Dar al-Mustafa Islamic seminary.  He also a member of the Supreme Advisory Council for the Tabah Foundation in Abu Dhabi.

Background
Habib Omar bin Hafiz was born on 27 May 1963 CE or 4 Muharram 1383 AH in Tarim, Hadhramaut, Yemen, and raised in a household that possessed a tradition and lineage of Islamic scholarship and righteousness by his father. His father was Muhammad bin Salim bin Hafiz, a Habib and mufti of Tarim, a pious caller to Islam, scholar, and a martyr of the communist uprising. He is a Sayyid (a descendant of the Islamic prophet Muhammad), through his grandson Husayn ibn Ali. The surname "Hafiz" comes from his great grandfather's name, a branch of the family of "Shaykh Abubakr bin Salim", which is also the name of his paternal thirteenth generation progenitor.

His lineage is recorded as follows: He is Umar bin Muhammad, bin Salim, bin Hafiz, bin Abd Allah, bin Abu Bakr, bin Aydarus, bin Umar, bin Aydarus, bin Umar, bin Abu Bakr, bin Aydarus, bin Husayn, bin Fakhr al-Wujūd al-Shaykh Abu Bakr, bin Salim, bin Abd Allah, bin Abd al-Rahman, bin Abd Allah, bin Abd al-Rahman al-Saqqaf, bin Muhammad Mawla al-Dawilah, bin Ali Mawla al-Darak, bin Alawi al-Ghayur, bin Muhammad al-Faqih al-Muqaddam, bin Ali, bin Muhammad Sahib al-Mirbat, bin Ali Khali Qasam, bin Alawi al-Thani, bin Muhammad Sahib al-Sawma'ah, bin Alawi al-Awwal, bin Ubayd Allah, bin Ahmad al-Muhajir, bin Isa al-Rumi, bin Muhammad al-Naqib, bin Ali al-Uraydi, bin Ja'far al-Sadiq, bin Muhammad al-Baqir, bin Ali Zayn al-Abidin, bin Husayn, bin Ali bin Abi Talib and Fatimah al-Zahra, the daughter of Muhammad.

Early life
Having memorized the Qu'ran at a very young age, Habib also studied and memorized core texts in Fiqh (Islamic jurisprudence), the Arabic, Hadith (Prophetic traditions) and many other religious sciences. He studied Islamic sciences including spirituality from his father.

Later, he enrolled at the Ribat of al-Bayda', where he began studying the traditional Islamic sciences under the tutelage of Al-Habib Muhammad bin Abd-Allah al-Haddar, as well as under the Shafi‘i jurist and scholar Al-Habib Zain bin Sumait. Habib Omar was given permission to teach soon after.

He then studied under the mufti of Ta‘iz, al-Habib Ibrahim bin Aqil bin Yahya. He also studied under Shaikh al-Habib Muhammad al-Haddar, who gave him his daughter's hand in marriage. Bin Hafiz then traveled to the Hejaz and studied several books with scholars, including Al-Habib Abdul Qadir bin Ahmad al-Saqqaf, Al-Habib Ahmed Mashur al-Haddad, and Al-Habib Attas al-Habashi.

At the age of 15, Habib began to teach, while continuing to study and receive lessons.

Career

After returning to Tarim, bin Hafiz established Dar al-Mustafa, an Islamic educational seminary. Habib currently lives in Tarim, where he oversees the development of Dar al-Mustafa and the schools that have been set up under his management. Dar al-Mustafa has been featured in The New York Times. His seminary accepts students from a variety of countries. Some of his prominent students in the UK include Shaykh Ibrahim Osi Efa, and in the United States, Shaykh Abdul Karim Yahya and Shaykh John (Yahya) Rhodus, while his prominent students in Indonesia include the late Habib Munzir Al-Musawa.

Habib travels regularly to meet with students and leaders, deliver talks and media interviews, and participate in official and private functions. Among the places he has been include: the Persian Gulf states, Syria, Lebanon, Jordan, Egypt, Morocco, Algeria, Sudan, Mali, Kenya, Tanzania, South Africa, the Comoros Islands, India, Pakistan, Sri Lanka, Indonesia, Malaysia, Singapore, Brunei, Australia, Britain, France, Germany, Holland, Belgium, Denmark, Sweden, and Spain. He has connected to the chains of transmission of the scholars of these regions.

In 2006, Habib met with Muhammad Tahir-ul-Qadri; they exchanged knowledge on Islam, and he also received an Ijazah (certificate to teach) of Hadith from Tahir-ul-Qadri.

In 2007, Habib joined the ranks of the world's leading Muslim academics and scholars as a signatory to A Common Word Between Us and You, a document that builds bridges between the Muslim and Christian communities. He has also spoken at Cambridge University on the need for such a dialogue.

In July 2008, he partnered with Muslim Aid Australia as founder of Yemen-based NGO Al-Rafah Charitable Society to address issues of poverty and hunger and lack of sufficient health care that affect areas of Tarim.

In 2011, Habib toured the United Kingdom, Canada and the United States for outreach purposes and da'wah (calling others to Islam).

Recognition
In 2019, Habib was listed at number 8 in The 500 Most Influential Muslims, an annual ranking compiled by Georgetown University's Prince Al-Waleed Center for Muslim–Christian Understanding and the Royal Islamic Strategic Studies Centre of Jordan.

Habib has appeared in the list's top 50 every year since its inaugural publication in 2009.

Writings and publications
Habib has many audio and visual publications as well as writings. Among the latter are:

 Mukhtar al-Hadith: Selection of Noble Prophetic Traditions (published in 2011 by the Ribat Institute)
 Two collections of hadith: Selections from Shifa al-Saqim (al-Mukhtar min Shifa al-Saqim) and The Light of Faith From the Speech of the Beloved of al-Rahman (Nur al-Iman min Kalam Habib al-Rahman)
 Aid to Those Seeking the Creator's Pleasure, by Clarifying the Noble Traits of Character (Is’af Talibi Rida al-Khallaq bi Bayan Makarim al-Akhlaq)
 Advice to Students (Tawjihat al-Tullab)
 Our Traits (Khuluquna)
 Forthpourings of Favor from the Mercy of the Giver of Favors (Fa’idat al-mann min Rahamat Wahhab al-Minan)
 Directing the Intelligent to the Contentment of the Beneficent (Tawjih al-Nabih li-Mardat Barih)
 The Glorious Treasure (al-Dhakira al-Musharrafa)
 The Summary of Prophetic Aid, a book of invocations (Khuslasa al-Maddad al-Nabawi fil-Adhkar)
 Two mawlids, celebrating the life of Muhammad: The Shimmering Light Mentioning the Birth of the Interceding Prophet (al-Diya al-Lami' fi Dhikr Mawlid al-Nabi al-Shafi') and The Pure Drink Mentioning the Life of the Fullest of Moons (al-Sharab al-Tuhur fi Dhikri Sirati Badri al-Budur)
 The Forthpouring of Spiritual Aid, a Compilation of Sermons (Fayd al-Imdad)
 The Preacher’s Refinement (Thaqafat al- Khatib)
 A collection of poetry

See also

 2016 international conference on Sunni Islam in Grozny
Islam in Yemen
List of Yemenis
Ba'Alawi
Ash'ari
Shafi'i
Sufism

References

External links
Official Website

Facebook Page of Habib Omar

1963 births
Living people
Asharis
Shafi'is
Yemeni Sufis
Sunni Sufis
Muslim reformers
Scholars of Sufism
Yemeni Sunni Muslim scholars of Islam
Yemeni imams
Hadhrami people
Hashemite people
20th-century Yemeni people